Nine ships of the Royal Navy have been named HMS Emerald.

 was a 28-gun sixth rate, originally the French Emeraude.
 was a 32-gun fifth rate launched in 1762 and broken up in 1793.
 was a 36-gun fifth rate launched in 1795 and broken up in 1836.
 was a tender purchased in 1820 and broken up in 1847.
 was a wood screw frigate launched in 1856 and sold in 1869.
 was a screw corvette launched in 1876 and sold in 1906.
She was renamed HMS Amelia in 1888, HMS Colleen in 1905, HMS Colleen Old in 1916, HMS Emerald in 1918 and HMS Cuckoo later in 1918. She was sold in 1922.
 was an  light cruiser launched in 1920 and broken up in 1948.

A fictional frigate named Emerald is commanded at the Battle of Camperdown by the title character in Lady Caroline Lamb's 1816 novel Glenarvon.

References

Royal Navy ship names